Ritualized aggression is when animals use a range of behaviours as posture or warning but without engaging in actual aggression, which is expensive in terms of energy and the risk of injury. Ritualized aggression involves a graded series of behaviours or displays that include threatening gestures (such as vocalizations, spreading of wings or gill covers, lifting and presentation of claws, head bobbing, tail beating, lunging, etc.) and occasionally posturing physical actions such as inhibited (non-injurious) bites.

Examples

Cats 
Domestic cats (Felis catus) are very territorial and defend their territories with ritualized body posturing, stalking, staring, spitting, yowling and howling.

Spider monkeys 
Spider monkeys (genus Ateles) defend their territory by screams, barks, rattling or dropping branches, and urinating and defecating on intruders below.

Oscar cichlids 
Oscar cichlids (Astronotus ocellatus) are able to rapidly alter their colouration, a trait which facilitates ritualised territorial and combat behaviours amongst conspecifics. Individuals of another cichlid species, the blunthead cichlid (Tropheus moorii), defend their feeding territory with a display, quivering the tail and fins to intimidate, or an attack, darting at the intruder and chasing them away. Astatotilapia burtoni cichlids have similar displays of aggressive behaviour if they are territorial, which include threat displays and chasing.

Ring-tailed lemur 
Male ring-tailed lemurs have scent glands on their wrists, chests, and in the genital area.  During encounters with rival males they may perform ritualized aggression by having a "stink fight". The males anoint their tails by rubbing the ends of their tails on the inside of their wrists and on their chests. They then arch their tails over their bodies and wave them at their opponent. The male toward which this is directed either responds with a display of his own, physical aggression, or flees. "Stink fights" can last from 10 minutes to one hour.

Creek chub 
The creek chub (Semotilus atromaculatus) engages in ritualized aggression when others of the species invade its territory. Engaging in parallel swimming, the fish widens its fins and mouth and swims at a caudal fin beat. Intimidating opponent fish throughout these rituals, the forward fish stops and directs blows to the head of the other fish to ensure territory dominance.

See also 
 Courtship display and Agonistic behavior and courtship
 Ritualized fighting or Ritualized combat
 Ritualised fighting in Meat ants
 Trading blows

References 

Ethology